This is a list of cinema of the world by continent and country.

By continent
Cinema of Africa
Cinema of Asia
South Asian cinema
Southeast Asian cinema
Cinema of North America
Cinema of Latin America
Cinema of Europe
Cinema of Oceania

By country

Cinema of Afghanistan
Cinema of Albania
Cinema of Algeria
Cinema of Argentina
Cinema of Armenia
Cinema of Australia
Cinema of Austria
Cinema of Azerbaijan 
Cinema of Bahrain
Cinema of Bangladesh
Cinema of Belarus
Cinema of Belgium
Cinema of Bhutan
Cinema of Bosnia and Herzegovina
Cinema of Brazil
Cinema of Bulgaria
Cinema of Burkina Faso
Cinema of Burma
Cinema of Cambodia
Cinema of Canada
Cinema of Quebec
 Cinema of Chad
Cinema of Chile
Cinema of China
Cinema of Colombia
Cinema of Croatia
Cinema of Cuba
Cinema of Cyprus
Cinema of the Czech Republic
Cinema of Denmark
Cinema of Ecuador
Cinema of Egypt
Cinema of Estonia
Cinema of the Faroe Islands
Cinema of Fiji
Cinema of Finland
Cinema of France
Cinema of Georgia
Cinema of Germany
Cinema of Greece
Cinema of Haiti
Cinema of Hong Kong
Hong Kong action cinema
Cinema of Hungary
Cinema of Iceland
Cinema of India
 Assamese
 Bengali
 Bhojpuri
 Chakma
 Chhattisgarhi
 Deccani
 Dogri
 Gujarati
 Haryanvi
 Hindi
 Kannada
 Kashmiri
 Konkani
 Malayalam
 Marathi
 Meitei
 Oriya
 Punjabi
 Rajasthani
 Sanskrit
 Tamil
 Telugu
 Tulu
Cinema of Indonesia
Cinema of Iran
Iranian New Wave
Cinema of Iraq
Cinema of Ireland
Cinema of Israel
Cinema of Italy
Cinema of Jamaica
Cinema of Japan
Japanese New Wave
Samurai cinema
History of anime
Cinema of Jordan
Cinema of Kenya
Cinema of Korea
Cinema of North Korea
Cinema of South Korea
Cinema of Kosovo
Cinema of Kuwait
Cinema of Latvia
Cinema of Lebanon 
Cinema of Lithuania
Cinema of Luxembourg
Cinema of Malaysia
Malaysian Tamil cinema
Cinema of Mexico 
Golden Age of Mexican cinema
Cinema of Madagascar
Cinema of Moldova
Cinema of Mongolia
Cinema of Montenegro 
Cinema of Morocco
Cinema of Nepal
Tharu cinema
Cinema of the Netherlands
Cinema of New Zealand
Cinema of Niger
Cinema of Nigeria
Cinema of Norway
Cinema of North Macedonia
Cinema of Oceania
Cinema of Oman
Cinema of Pakistan
Lollywood 
Pollywood
Cinema of Balochistan
Cinema of Sindh
Cinema of Palestine
Cinema of Paraguay
Cinema of Peru
Cinema of the Philippines
Cinema of Poland
Cinema of Portugal
Cinema of Puerto Rico
Cinema of Romania
Romanian New Wave
Cinema of Russia
Cinema of the Russian Empire
History of Russian animation
Cinema of Saudi Arabia
Cinema of Senegal
Cinema of Serbia
Cinema of Singapore
Malaysian and Singaporean Tamil cinema
Cinema of Slovakia
Cinema of Slovenia
Cinema of Somalia
Cinema of South Africa
Cinema of the Soviet Union
Cinema of Spain
Catalan cinema
Cinema of Galicia
Cinema of Sri Lanka
Cinema of Sri Lankan Tamil
Cinema of Sudan
Cinema of Sweden
Cinema of Switzerland
Cinema of Syria
Cinema of Taiwan
Cinema of Tajikistan
Cinema of Thailand
Cinema of Tunisia
Cinema of Turkey
Cinema of Turkmenistan
Cinema of Ukraine
Cinema of the United Arab Emirates
Cinema of the United Kingdom
Cinema of Northern Ireland
Cinema of Scotland
Cinema of Wales
Cinema of the United States
Cinema of Florida
No wave cinema
Cinema of Transgression
Cinema of Uruguay
Cinema of Uzbekistan
Cinema of Venezuela
Cinema of Vietnam
Cinema of Yemen
Cinema of Yugoslavia
Yugoslav Black Wave

By region
 Cinema of the Caribbean
 Cinema of Latin America
 Cinema of Oceania

See also

Film
History of film
World cinema

 World

Cinema of the world